The British Vietnamese International School Hanoi (BVIS Hanoi) is a bilingual international school in Hanoi, Vietnam, offering a British-style education in both English and Vietnamese languages for ages 3 to 18 (UK Nursery to Year 13). BVIS Hanoi is located in the Vincom Royal City, Thanh Xuan District and was opened in August 2013. BVIS students follow a combination of the British National Curriculum, the International Early Years’ and Primary Curriculum models up to Year 6. In Year 10, students begin Cambridge Assessment International Examinations (CAIE) in International General Certificate of Secondary Education (IGCSE). In Years 12 and 13, students study for International A Levels.

History 
BVIS was a part of the BIS Group of Schools in Vietnam, which started with the founding of the pre-school Tiny Tots in Ho Chi Minh in 1997. In 2000, the original Tiny Tots was expanded to accommodate additional primary classrooms, and became the British International School, Ho Chi Minh City.

In 2011, the first dual-language school of the BIS Group, which is named British Vietnamese International School (BVIS) was established in the Binh Chanh district of Ho Chi Minh City. In August 2013, British Vietnamese International School Hanoi (BVIS Hanoi) was opened in the Vincom Royal City, Thanh Xuan District, Hanoi.

In March 2015, BIS Group of Schools, Vietnam became a part of the Nord Anglia Education family of schools (NAE), growing NAE's global network to 69 schools across 29 countries.

Curriculum 
The curriculum at BVIS is a blend of the English National Curriculum and the Vietnamese National Curriculum determined by the Ministry of Education and Training Vietnam (MOET). Vietnamese Language, Literature, History, Geography and Mathematics are taught alongside aspects of the National Curriculum for England.

The school delivers the full British Curriculum covering Early Years Foundation Stage from the English National Curriculum, the International Primary Curriculum (IPC) for Primary students and the Cambridge International General Certificate of Secondary Education (IGCSE) and General Certificate of Education Advanced Level (A Levels) programmes for more senior students.

Facilities 
BVIS Hanoi facilities consist of three main buildings, one for each of Early Years Foundation Stage, Primary and Secondary, two libraries, two auditoria, two sports halls, a climbing wall an indoor 25m long swimming pool and grass playing fields. The school has specialist suites for STEAM programme such as: Science, Music, ICT, Art and Drama.

See also 
 British International School, Ho Chi Minh City
 British International School, Hanoi
 British Vietnamese International School, Ho Chi Minh City
 Nord Anglia Education

References 

International schools in Hanoi
High schools in Hanoi
Cambridge schools in Vietnam
British international schools in Asia
Nord Anglia Education